The following is an alphabetical list of members of the United States House of Representatives from the state of Mississippi.  For chronological tables of members of both houses of the United States Congress from the state (through the present day), see United States congressional delegations from Mississippi. The list of names should be complete as of January 3, 2023, but other data may be incomplete.

Current representatives 
 : Trent Kelly (R) (since 2015)
 : Bennie Thompson (D) (since 1993)
 : Michael Guest (R) (since 2019)
 : Mike Ezell (R) (since 2023)

List of members representing the state

See also

List of United States senators from Mississippi
United States congressional delegations from Mississippi
Mississippi's congressional districts

References
politicalgraveyard.com - 1870s
politicalgraveyard.com - John R. Lynch

Mississippi
 
United States representatives